Static Icon is a synthpop band. They started in Adelaide, Australia as a three-piece band called "Das Concept". In their first incarnation they were a Depeche Mode cover band. Gradually they introduced more and more original material into their set. To complete the transition to a fully original band, they changed their name to Static Icon and dropped all but one or two Depeche Mode covers from their set.

Through association with bands in the Melbourne, Australia industrial music scene they were introduced to and subsequently signed with EBM label Machinery Records in Berlin, Germany, with whom they released two albums, starting with Sin Machine in 1995. 

Their first album was recorded in Adelaide, but there was some issues around the master tapes being stolen. Shortly after they moved to Berlin, Germany where much of the album was re-recorded.

Their second and best known album Slave was produced by Marc Heal and released in 1997.

Static Icon toured the better part of 1997 with the "SLAVE TOUR" 
The breakdown of communication with the members and the record label resulted in the cancellation of the second leg of the European tour. The band need their own personal space for a while. Alan Wicks moved to London where he would start writing the third Static Icon album. Timo Bishop married his German girlfriend and moved back to Adelaide, Australia and Micheal Walker moved back to Melbourne, Australia.

1998 saw Alan Wicks moving back to Australia to finish writing the third Album. Melbourne and Sydney both played their role along with London in his demoing this album, which was written about his own experience as a wide-eyed person that moves to a mega city and how he sees that our conditionings as humans and our ideas of right and wrong and our man-made laws and beliefs don't work with this new era of the Mega city life style. The album was finally demoed at the end of 1998 and was ready for to go into the studio to be completed. Noise records were desperate for the band's third Album to be released and were putting on the pressure to hand over the work to them.

External links
[ Allmusic]

Australian synthpop groups
Musical groups from Adelaide
Musical groups from Berlin